Kimberly Yee (born February 23, 1974) is an American politician serving as the 36th Arizona state treasurer. She is the first Asian-American woman elected to the Arizona State Legislature.

A member of the Republican Party, she was elected to the Arizona House of Representatives for the 10th legislative district from 2011 to 2013 and the Arizona Senate for the 20th legislative district from 2013 until 2019. On November 29, 2017, she announced her candidacy for the position of Arizona state treasurer; she was elected to the position on November 6, 2018. As Treasurer, Kimberly Yee is currently the highest-ranking statewide elected Republican woman in Arizona.

Yee announced her candidacy for Arizona governor in May 2021 but withdrew from the Republican  nomination race in January 2022 to run for reelection as treasurer.

Early life and education
Yee was born and raised in Phoenix, Arizona; she traces her ancestry to Taishan, Guangdong. Yee attended Greenway High School in Phoenix where she was a student journalist at the Demon Dispatch in the early 1990s. Yee is a graduate of Pepperdine University where she earned a bachelor's degree in political science and a bachelor's degree in English. She also holds a master's degree in public administration from Arizona State University's School of Public Affairs, and was the recipient of the honored Scholar-Citizen Award.

Career
Yee worked for California governors Pete Wilson and Arnold Schwarzenegger. She was then communications director at the office of the state treasurer of Arizona. Upon the recommendation of Governor Jan Brewer, Yee was appointed by the Maricopa County Board of Supervisors to replace Republican representative Doug Quelland after he was ousted for violating Clean Election Limits.

Yee served as state committeeman for the Arizona Republican Party, chair of the Arizona Legislative District 10 Republican Committee, and delegate for Arizona at the 2008 Republican National Convention.

As a member of the Arizona House of Representatives in 2011, Kimberly Yee was the sponsor of the "Ultrasound and Heartbeat Bill" to require doctors to provide women the option to see their baby's ultrasound image and hear their baby's heartbeat if it is audible, before proceeding with an abortion. The bill passed and was signed into law.

Yee was an invited speaker at the 2016 Republican National Convention.

Yee represented District 20 in the Arizona Senate from 2013 to 2019. Yee also served as state Senate majority leader from 2017 to 2019. She became the second woman elected to this position in Arizona’s history, following U.S. Justice Sandra Day O’Connor who served the position in 1973, forty-four years earlier.

Yee was elected Arizona treasurer on November 6, 2018.

In 2018, she implemented Senate Bill 1184, which required college students to pass a course in economics that includes financial literacy and personal finance management in order to graduate. Yee went on to create a statewide literacy task force, a 16-member board assigned the job of identifying the scope of financial literacy and proposing solutions for improvement.

As Arizona state treasurer, Yee was able to distribute the two highest years of earnings in Arizona's history back to back, resulting in less direct taxes for Arizonans to pay. In 2020, $559 million was distributed in investment earnings, and in 2019 $567 million was distributed. Today, assets under Treasurer Yee’s management stands at $24 billion, an increase of over 54 percent in two years.

During the 2020 presidential campaign, she served nationally as a Co-Chairwoman of the Asian Pacific Americans for Trump Coalition and as a Member of the Pro-Life Voices for Trump Coalition. Yee wrote an op-ed in support of President Trump and his vision of the American dream.

On May 17, 2021, Yee announced her candidacy for Governor of Arizona in the 2022 Arizona gubernatorial election. She later dropped out of the governor's race, running for re-election as Arizona State Treasurer.

Elections
2010 Challenging House District 10 incumbent Republican representatives Doug Quelland and James Weiers in the four-way August 24, 2010 Republican primary, Representative Weiers placed first, Yee placed second with 6,925 votes, and Representative Quelland placed third; in the November 2, 2010 General election, Yee took the first seat with 19,485 votes and Representative Weiers took the second seat ahead of Democratic nominees former representative Jackie Thrasher and Aaron Jahneke.
2012 With Republican senator John McComish redistricted to District 18, Yee was unopposed for the Senate District 20 August 28, 2012 Republican primary, winning with 15,519 votes; and won the three-way November 6, 2012 General election with 37,371 votes against Democratic nominee Michael Powell and former Republican representative Doug Quelland running as an Independent.
2014 Senate District 20 Yee won reelection against Democratic candidate Patty Kennedy. Yee winning with 25,103 votes against Kennedy's 16,613 votes.
2016 Senate District 20 Yee won reelection against Democratic candidate Larry Herrera. Yee winning 40,122 votes against Herrera's 28,987 votes.
2018 General election for Arizona Treasurer on November 6, 2018, Yee defeated Mark Manoil.
2022 General election Yee won reelection for Arizona Treasurer on November 8, 2022, defeating Martín Quezada.

References

External links

Official page as state senator in the Arizona State Legislature
Campaign site
 

|-

1974 births
21st-century American politicians
21st-century American women politicians
American politicians of Chinese descent
American women of Chinese descent in politics
Asian-American people in Arizona politics
Republican Party Arizona state senators
ASU College of Public Service & Community Solutions alumni
Living people
Republican Party members of the Arizona House of Representatives
Pepperdine University alumni
Politicians from Phoenix, Arizona
State treasurers of Arizona
Women state constitutional officers of Arizona
Women state legislators in Arizona
Asian conservatism in the United States